Daniel Waldo (September 10, 1762 – July 30, 1864) was an American clergyman. Born in Windham, Connecticut, Waldo served in the American Revolutionary War and later became a missionary and clergyman. In 1856, at the age of 94, Waldo was named Chaplain of the House of Representatives.

It is recorded that he was in good health during his service to the House; he was also one of seven Revolutionary War veterans who, having survived into the age of photography, were featured in the 1864 book The Last Men of the Revolution (which gives many more details of his life). Waldo died in Syracuse, New York at the advanced age of 101, of injuries sustained after falling down a flight of stairs, and he was given a memorial in the House itself.

References
Reverend E.B. Hillard, The Last Men of the Revolution (1864), republished 1968 with additional notes by Wendell Garrett.

External links
 "Father Waldo's America"

1762 births
1864 deaths
American centenarians
Men centenarians
People of colonial Connecticut
Yale University alumni
People from Windham, Connecticut
Chaplains of the United States House of Representatives
Burials in New York (state)
Deaths from falls
People of Connecticut in the American Revolution
Clergy in the American Revolution